Missi Pyle (born November 16, 1972) is an American actress and singer. She has appeared in a number of successful films, including Galaxy Quest (1999), Big Fish (2003), Bringing Down the House (2003), Dodgeball: A True Underdog Story (2004), Charlie and the Chocolate Factory (2005), Harold & Kumar Escape from Guantanamo Bay (2008), The Artist (2011), Gone Girl (2014), Captain Fantastic (2016), and Ma (2019).

Pyle has also appeared in various television series, such as The Mentalist (2010), Cleaners (2013–2014), Jennifer Falls (2014), Another Period (2015–2018), Bordertown (2016), The Soul Man (2016), Mom (2017), Impulse (2018–2019), and Dirty John (2020).

In addition to acting, Pyle has also worked as a singer. With actress Shawnee Smith, she served as half of Smith & Pyle, a country rock duo.

Early life
 
Pyle attended the North Carolina School of the Arts in Winston-Salem, North Carolina, and graduated in 1995. For her achievements, Pyle was honored by the Poplar Pike Playhouse at her alma mater Germantown High School in Germantown, Tennessee.

Career
Pyle has guest starred on many television shows, including Heroes, Mad About You, Boston Legal, Frasier, The Sarah Silverman Program, and 2 Broke Girls. She started her film career with a minor role in As Good as It Gets, starring Helen Hunt and Jack Nicholson. After her breakout role in Galaxy Quest, she had supporting roles in Bringing Down the House (for which she and Queen Latifah were nominated for an MTV Movie Award for Best Fight), Josie and the Pussycats, Home Alone 4, Exposed, Big Fish, Along Came Polly, Soul Plane, Stormbreaker, and Charlie and the Chocolate Factory. She was also the female lead in BachelorMan. She also appears in Dodgeball: A True Underdog Story. She also had a brief appearance in 50 First Dates and starred in A Cinderella Story: Once Upon a Song.

Pyle played Jake's elementary school teacher Ms. Pasternak on Two and a Half Men. The role was recast in 2009 for undisclosed reasons, however it is believed that it was to show the emotional change she went through after Charlie dumped and hurt her [source IMDB]. Pyle returned to the series in the same role in 2011 and again in the series finale "Of Course He's Dead" in 2015.

In 2008, Missi starred in the Broadway play Boeing-Boeing opposite Christine Baranski, Mark Rylance, Greg Germann, Paige Davis and Rebecca Gayheart. The play closed in January 2009.

Pyle was scheduled to ring the closing bell for the trading day at the New York Stock Exchange on September 29, 2008, to promote Boeing-Boeing, but backed out minutes before the close of trading in order to not associate herself with ending a calamitous day of financial turmoil which resulted in the Dow Jones Industrial Average losing 778 points, the largest point loss ever in a session in the wake of the financial crisis of 2007–2008. She watched from the floor as an NYSE staffer pushed the button and gaveled the end of trading instead.

She was part of a country music group with actress Shawnee Smith called Smith & Pyle. The two actresses met while filming an ABC comedy pilot titled Traveling in Packs. The band started after Smith invited Pyle to join her in attending the Coachella Valley Music and Arts Festival. While stuck in traffic, Pyle talked about her dream to be a rock star and Smith agreed to form a band with her. Their first album, "It's OK to Be Happy", was released digitally through iTunes and Amazon.com in July 2008. The debut album was recorded in Joshua Tree, California at Rancho De La Luna and was produced by Chris Goss. The two actresses have also become business partners and formed their own record label called Urban Prairie Records, under which "It's OK to be Happy" was released. According to an interview Smith did with pretty-scary.net in August 2008, a Smith & Pyle television or webisode series might be in the works. Smith also mentioned the idea of a series on Fangoria radio with Dee Snider. Currently there are three videos posted on YouTube that show the making of the record. They also have a 10-minute "making of" video on Vimeo called Smith & Pyle: Desert Sessions.

Personal life
Pyle married naturalist Casey Anderson on September 12, 2008. The wedding was country-western themed and took place in Montana. Wedding guests included bandmate Shawnee Smith and comedian Steve Agee. Anderson's pet grizzly bear, Brutus, served as his best man in the ceremony. Pyle and Anderson appeared in "Grizzly Dogs", the October 22, 2010, episode of Dog Whisperer, in which they sought the help of Cesar Millan to rehabilitate their dog. Pyle confirmed their breakup in 2013. She has one daughter.

Filmography

Film

Television

Web

Appearances

Stage credits

Discography

Albums
 It's OK to Be Happy, Smith & Pyle (2008)

Singles
 "One Night Stand", Smith & Pyle (2010)
 "Rafael", Smith & Pyle (2010)

References

External links
 
 
 
 

Living people
20th-century American actresses
21st-century American actresses
Actresses from Houston
Actresses from Nashville, Tennessee
American country singer-songwriters
American film actresses
American musical theatre actresses
American stage actresses
American television actresses
American women country singers
Country musicians from Tennessee
Country musicians from Texas
Musicians from Houston
People from Germantown, Tennessee
Singers from Nashville, Tennessee
Singer-songwriters from Texas
Singer-songwriters from Tennessee
1972 births